David D. Downie (born in San Francisco in 1958) is a multilingual Paris-based American nonfiction author, crime novelist and journalist who writes most often about culture, food and travel.

Biography
Downie's father, a Californian from Garden Grove, was a G.I. during the Second World War. His Italian mother, an artist trained at the Fine Arts Academyin Rome, was a GI bride and lived as an eccentric, pantheist art teacher in the San Francisco Bay Area. Thanks to her and to his "formidable" grandmother, who migrated to California with her daughter but never learned English, he can claim Italian literally as both second language and mother tongue. Youngest of six children, he was "weaned on crime novels and thrillers" and grew up reading Victor Hugo and Dante in old illustrated editions. His love for Rome, his mother's native city, arose from living there for several years in the mid-1960s. His early and enduring enthusiasm for Paris springs from waiting tables at a Bay Area French restaurant, from volunteering as an usher at the San Francisco Opera where he saw Puccini's La Bohême, and from a first visit to the city in 1976.

 
A graduate of the University of California, Berkeley, Downie took a master's degree in Italian from Brown University in Providence, Rhode Island, where he was a Kenyon Scholar and University Fellow. He worked in the early 1980s as a translator, interpreter and press officer in Milan. Fiction that he wrote at this period received "very flattering rejection letters" from The New Yorker, but he was already beginning to publish nonfiction in magazines and newspapers. After what he calls a "roller-coaster marriage" to an Italian artist, he returned to Paris in 1986, and soon afterwards married the photographer Alison Harris. Now spending part of each year in Italy and part in France, for more than thirty years he has lived by his writing and by giving occasional custom-made tours of Paris, Burgundy, Rome and the Italian Riviera.

Together with Alison Harris he walked across much of central France following sections of the Way of Saint James, the greatest medieval European pilgrimage route. Appropriately for a "skeptic born and raised by skeptics ... a survivor both of the Haight-Ashbury and Berkeley’s Telegraph Avenue", this was more of an "anti-pilgrimage" from which he created a memoir, published in 2013. "After twenty years of living and working in France," he wrote, "I simply felt the need to make my own mental map of the country by walking across it step by measured step", beginning at Vézelay and passing through Bibracte and Cluny on ancient pathways. According to classicist and art historian Andrew Riggsby, in Paris to the Pyrenees Downie turned a story of self-discovery into an exploration of time and place. In this image of France "layers of the past are stacked and patched and run together: Caesar and his legions confronting Vercingétorix ... Roland and Charlemagne ... Viollet-le-Duc’s theme-park-ish restorations ... the Resistance to the Nazis, and even the travels of an earlier, more gluttonous, and less reflective David Downie". Anthony Sattin, another writer who combines travel with history, considers that in Downie's case the act of walking with the photographer Alison, the pleasures of the countryside, "the lighting out for the territory when one is a certain age", give this book its reason. The walk ("which he completed on foot between the titular locations", according to Gilbert Taylor's risky claim in Booklist) was in reality anything but complete when Downie, "an amiable companion, questioning and willing, and flawed", found that "a damaged back and aching knees force[d] him to stop just outside Mâcon", a long way from the Pyrenees and much further still from Compostela.

His writing reflects an abiding interest in French and Italian culture and in the history and reality of food. For his first food book, Cooking the Roman Way, "when I had doubts about classic Roman recipes ... I asked my mother," he admitted. "She taught me the basics of cooking as soon as I grew tall enough to stir the pot of bubbling garofolato (beef stew)" for Tuesday dinner, whose leftovers would become pasta sauce for the Wednesday spaghetti feed. The uninhibited conviviality of Roman meals was what made the eating experience so pleasant, he advised the reader: this conviviality was "the hidden ingredient in all the recipes". "Perhaps Downie takes food a bit too seriously," Miranda Seymour reflected in praising A Taste of Paris in the New York Times Book Review. She quotes him as he savours a Parisian supper: "How delicious my appealingly plated but very old-fashioned roast pork loin with mustard sauce à l'ancienne. How polite and professional the service. How affordable the more than potable Château Haut-Musset Lalande-de-Pomerol." Downie scarcely disputes it. Earlier, preparing for the Way of Saint James, he had admitted to "a quarter century of high living as a travel and food writer", to "the recipes I'd tested, the buttery croissants and fluffy mousses I'd savored", to calvados, cognac, and even "Inspector Maigret's Vieille Prune, a lethal eau de vie distilled from plums".

Fiction 
His first crime novel, La tour de l'immonde, about violence and murder in central Paris and its banlieue, was published in French in 1997 in the fiction collection Le Poulpe. Aiming to sell the English-language version he took the text to New York. An editor at Vintage Books, finding it "too French", was sufficiently intrigued to ask for something new: this in turn was rejected as "too French ... very strange, nice writing, but not for us". The new work, after further rewriting, became Downie's second novel, Paris: City of Night, a thriller involving a putative terrorist plot to destroy parts of Paris. It appeared in 2009. The story came to him, he has explained, "because I woke up one morning blind in one eye. I have posterior ischemic optic neuritis. The color drained from my right eye as the optic nerve died ... Understanding light and the functioning of the eye ... became an obsession". Hence Paris: City of Night began as a murder mystery about a historical character from the world of photography.

A third novel, The Gardener of Eden, was published by Pegasus Books in 2019. It is set in his native California, under a "new crypto-fascist government", in a small town that is now an economic desert, its salmon fishery and lumber industries were sacrificed to clearcutting and environmental plunder". This story of literary suspense is built on "deeply disturbing observations of contemporary American culture".

Nonfiction 
Commenting on Downie's nonfiction Michael Ondaatje has called him "the master of educated curiosity". His first non-fiction book in English, Enchanted Liguria appeared in 1997. It was translated the following year in Italy under the title La Liguria incantata. His book Paris, Paris (first edition 2005) explores the sites of Paris, from the Ile Saint-Louis to Les Halles and the parks of Montsouris and Buttes Chaumont. Paris, Paris includes insights on Georges Pompidou, François Mitterrand and Coco Chanel. The book was reissued in April 2011 as part of the Armchair Traveler series at Broadway Books (Random House), now including a new chapter (titled "Hit the Road Jacques") on the Way of Saint James in Paris. Meanwhile he had been invited to translate Jean-Christophe Napias's Quiet Corners of Paris (The Little Bookroom, 2007), which in turn led him to write Quiet Corners of Rome for the same publisher: this appeared in 2011.

His work is full of historical insights, although, as Margaret Quamme carefully warned librarians when recommending A Taste of Paris (2017), he "may not be temperamentally suited for writing a strictly chronological history". When researching A Passion for Paris: Romanticism and Romance in the City of Light (2015) he was walking in the footsteps of Baudelaire, Flaubert, Balzac, Hemingway and Gertrude Stein. In this exploration of Paris in the 19th century heyday of Romanticism, less-known figures aroused his special enthusiasm: Félix Nadar, pioneer photographer and impractical dreamer, and Henri Murger, sickly author of Scènes de la vie de Bohème which was transformed into Puccini's La Bohême. Downie's knowledge of the city and its artists seemed to grant him a mystical gift of access: doors left ajar and carriage gates left open. He recalled that Le Marais was once both royal and bohemian, and dominated by Victor Hugo; that the Montmartre of the Romantics was a grassy hill, with goat herds and real windmills, and its artists’ studios were vast, light and cheap.

His illustrated book on the contemporary cuisine of Rome, Cooking the Roman Way, was listed among the top ten cookbooks of 2002 by the Chicago Tribune, The Boston Globe and San Francisco Chronicle. The book is full of anecdotes about the names, hidden meanings and origins of Italian foods; useful notes explain the difference between farro and spelt and the nature and use of the quinto quarto ("fifth quarter") of butchered animals. Among his food- and wine-related books are three volumes in the Terroir Guides series, published by The Little Bookroom, and dedicated to the food and wine of the Italian Riviera (and Genoa), Rome and Burgundy.

"The fall is the best time to eat in France," Downie reported in autumn 2017 as A Taste of Paris was published, "everyone knows that. It's when everything comes in. It's the harvest season." As he recognised, French food awareness has an elitist side: "The reason Paris has great food in modern times is because of money ... All the best stuff gets rushed to Paris because this is the best market. There are rich families and demanding eaters here." A Taste of Paris begins with the food of Roman Paris, continues through the Middle Ages and Renaissance, "enlarges on the gourmand seventeenth and eighteenth centuries" to reach the present day, but "each historical episode is at the same time an exploration of some Parisian neighbourhood" from its origins to its modern food landmarks.

Journalism 
Downie's articles have appeared in about 50 publications, print and online, including the Los Angeles Times, San Francisco Chronicle, Bon Appétit, Gourmet, Gastronomica, The Art of Eating, Australian Financial Review, Salon.com, Epicurious.com and Concierge.com. He has acted as Paris correspondent, contributing editor or European editor for a number of publications, including Appellation, Art & Antiques and Departures. His writing has also appeared in anthologies, among them The Collected Traveler volumes on Paris, Southwest France and Central Italy.

Works 
 Books
 1995 : Un'altra Parigi, nove passeggiate insolite nella Ville Lumière (with Ulderico Munzi)
 1995 : The Irreverent Guide to Amsterdam
 1997 : Enchanted Liguria: A Celebration of the Culture, Lifestyle and Food of the Italian Riviera (Rizzoli International)
 Italian translation, 1998: La Liguria incantata: Cultura, stile di vita, cucina della Riviera ligure. Translated by Camilla Orlando (SAGEP, Genoa. )
 1997 : La tour de l'immonde (La Baleine)
 2002 : Cooking the Roman Way: Authentic recipes from the home cooks and trattorias of Rome (HarperCollins). Photography by Alison Harris
 2005 : Paris, Paris: Journey into the City of Light (Transatlantic Press; new edition, 2011, Broadway Books)
 2008 : Food Wine The Italian Riviera & Genoa (The Little Bookroom)
 2009 : Food Wine Rome (The Little Bookroom)
 2009 : Paris, City of Night (MEP, Inc)
 2010 : Food Wine Burgundy (The Little Bookroom)
 2011 : Quiet Corners of Rome (The Little Bookroom)
 2013 : Paris to the Pyrenees: A Skeptic Pilgrim Walks the way of Saint James (Pegasus Books)
 2015 : A Passion for Paris: Romanticism and Romance in the City of Light (St. Martin's Press)
 2017 : A Taste of Paris: A History of the Parisian Love Affair with Food (St. Martin's Press)
 2019 : The Gardener of Eden (Pegasus Books)

 As translator
 2007 : Jean-Christophe Napias, Quiet Corners of Paris (The Little Bookroom)

 Selected articles
 1999 : "Renzo Piano, Agent Provocateur" in San Francisco Chronicle: SFGate (16 May)
 2003 : "A Roman Anchovy's Tale" in Gastronomica vol. 3 pp. 25–28 JSTOR
 2003 : "Buried Treasure" in Los Angeles Times (8 June)
 2010 : "Letter from Rome: The view from the Janus Hill, or how some Romans think of Rome" at Gadling (4 August) 
 2011 : "Chartres Keeps Its Spiritual Allure" in San Francisco Chronicle: SFGate (10 July)
 2011 : "Walking on the Wild Side of Paris" at Gadling (22 November)
 2012 : "In the Shadow of Cinque Terre: discovering the treasures of La Spezia" at Gadling (28 December)
 2013 : "David's Discoveries: The beetle-loving calligrapher of Paris" at Gadling'' (30 June)

Notes

External links
Cooking the Roman Way
Paris, Paris
Author website
Author blog
Collaborating photographer website
Author interview on Guide2Paris

University of California, Berkeley alumni
Brown University fellows
American male journalists
American travel writers
American food writers
20th-century American novelists
1958 births
Living people
21st-century American novelists
American male novelists
20th-century American male writers
21st-century American male writers
20th-century American non-fiction writers
21st-century American non-fiction writers